Rotberg may refer to:

 , former German municipality, since 1998 part of Schönefeld-Waltersdorf
 Rotberg Castle in Metzerlen-Mariastein, Switzerland

People 

 Dana Rotberg (born 1960), Mexican film director
 Eduard Anton von Rotberg (1799–1884), Bavarian general
 Robert I. Rotberg (born 1935), American academic

See also 
 Rotberger
 Rothberg
 Rødberg